R. Suryaprakash  is a Carnatic vocalist, composer, and lyricist. An 'A Grade' artist of All India Radio, he has travelled extensively and received accolades for his performances.

Early life and education
Suryaprakash began studying music at the age of seven from his uncle Tirukkodikaval Shri V. Rajamani, a disciple of Semmangudi Srinivasa Iyer. Later, he learned under Shri M. A. Venugopalan, another disciple of Semmangudi. He received his advanced training from Sangeetha Kalanidhi T. V. Sankaranarayanan. He further enriched his repertoire by working with Smt. Sulochana Pattabiraman and Dr. V. V. Srivatsa, both eminent musicologists.

Suryaprakash holds a master's degree in Carnatic music from Madras University.
He was also awarded the doctorate degree in March 2020 by Madras University for his thesis titled "Structured and Systematic Approach to Manodharma Sangeetham".

Career
Suryaprakash is a regular performer in the Carnatic music circuit. He has been accompanied by leading stalwarts such as Umayalpuram K. Sivaraman, Mannargudi Easwaran, Thiruvarur Bhakthavatsalam, V. V. Ravi, Subhash Chandran.

Suryaprakash has performed extensively both in India and abroad in many countries such as Australia, Singapore, US, New Zealand, South Africa. He is a sought-after performer at international Carnatic music festivals, some of which being the Cleveland Thyagaraja Festival and the 'Festival of Asia' in Melbourne, Australia.

Suryaprakash is both a concert performer and a teacher, much sought after. He has conducted several workshops for aspiring students.

Suryaprakash has composed thillanas ragamalikas krithis. He has composed lyrics and set musical score for three Australian dance productions.

Awards
 Kalaimamani Award, Tamil Nadu Iyal Isai Nataka Mandram, Chennai, 2018
G. Ramanathan Award, Sri Parthasarathy Swami Sabha, Chennai, 2013
 Gana Kala Vipanchee, Padma Vibushan M. Balamuralikrishna, 2007
 Nada Chintamani, Chintamani Gayana Samaja, Chennai, 2007
 Best Vocalist, Madras Music Academy, Chennai, 2006
 Ganamrutha Sagara, Gana Mukundhapriya, Chennai, 2006
 Gambhira Gana Siromani, ABC, Sydney, 2005
 Best Vocalist, Madras Music Academy, Chennai, 2004
 Youth Excellence Award, Rotary Club of Madras, Chennai, 2004
 Ariyakudi Memorial Award, Sriragam Fine Arts, Chennai, 2004
 Nadachudhar, Nadabrahmam Music Journal, 2003
 Madhura Gana Tilaka, Indian Arts Academy, Melbourne, 2003
 Youth Excellence Award, Maharajapuram Viswanatha Iyer Trust, 2002
 Best Vivadhi Raga Exposition, Madras Music Academy, Chennai, 2001
 Yuva Kala Bharathi, Bharat Kalachar, Chennai, 1999
 Maharajapuram Sri Viswanatha Iyer Prize for Best Raga Alapana, Sri Krishna Gana Sabha, Chennai, 1996
 Best Vocalist, Indian Fine Arts Society, Chennai, 1995
 Best Vocalist, Sri Krishna Gana Sabha, Chennai, 1991

Discography
 1995 – one-hour recording, released by Kalavardhini. Accompaniment: V V Ravi and Thiruvarur Bhakthavatsalam.
 1998 – one-hour recording, released by Kalavardhini. Accompaniment: V V Srinivasa Rao and Mannarkoil Balaji.
 2000—CD and cassette titled "Shining Pearls of Swati Tirunal" by Carnatica. Accompaniment: Mullaivasal Chandramouli and Mannarkoil Balaji.
 2004—CD and cassette titled "Legendary Melodies," consisting of classical hits of M. K. Thyagaraja Bhagavathar, S. G. Kittappa, M M Dandapani Desikar, M. L. Vasanthakumari, and others. Released by Purnima Records. Accompaniment: V Suresh Babu, Tanjore Murugabhoopathi, R Ganapathi, & N Sundar.
 2005 – CD and cassette titled "Maestro's Popular Melodies". Released by Kosmic Music. Accompaniment: M A Krishnaswamy, Karukurichi Mohanram, and N Sundar.
 2006—CD titled "Shanmatha Sunaadam of Dikshithar". Released by Purnima Records. Accompaniment: Vittal Ramamurthy, Srimushnam V. Raja Rao and Vaikom R Gopalakrishnan.
 2007 – CD titled "Suryaprakash Live Concert – Bharat Sangeet Utsav 2007." Recorded and Released by Carnatica. Accompaniments: Nagai Sriram, Srimushnam V. Raja Rao and E. M. Subramaniam.          
 2009 – CD—Suryaprakash's first Tamil devotional twin album "Ethanai Kodi Inbam" and "Ananda Vilakku." Recorded and released by Guru Maharaji Trust, New Delhi.         
 2009 – CD titled "Consonance." Released by Purnima Records. Accompaniment: Raghavendra Rao, Tanjore Murugaboopathi, Murali                                                      
 2009 – CD titled Sri Rush Kshetram Tamil kritis/ compositions of Neduntheevu Ponn Suhir on Sri Rajarajeswari Peetam, Rush,NY, USA rendered by Suryaprakash. Recorded and released by Swati Soft Solutions.         
 2010 – CD titled "Raagangale...Paadalgale.." Carnatic Double CD Album. Accompaniment: B Ananthakrishnan and S J Arjun Ganesh Released by Purnima Records.
 2012 – CD titled "Madhura Gaanam". Carnatic album. Accompaniment: Nagai Sriram and Tanjore Murugaboopathi

References

External links
 http://www.thehindu.com/arts/music/both-original-and-traditional/article2147187.ece 
 http://www.thehindu.com/arts/music/blazing-tower-of-music/article2368526.ece 
 http://www.thehindu.com/todays-paper/tp-features/tp-fridayreview/cosmic-vision-of-khambodi/article2739621.ece 
 http://www.thehindu.com/arts/music/resonating-with-bhakti/article2714487.ece
 http://www.thehindu.com/todays-paper/tp-features/tp-fridayreview/music-is-perfect-harmony-of-the-heart-and-mind/article658470.ece 
 http://www.thehindu.com/todays-paper/tp-national/tp-tamilnadu/spread-the-glory-of-traditional-music-among-the-uninitiated/article499437.ece

Tamil singers
Singers from Chennai
Living people
1967 births
Male Carnatic singers
Carnatic singers
Tenors
21st-century Indian male classical singers
20th-century Indian male classical singers